Lenka Kováčová (born 22 May 1966) is a Czech rowing coxswain. She competed in the women's eight event at the 1992 Summer Olympics.

References

External links
 

1966 births
Living people
Czech female rowers
Olympic rowers of Czechoslovakia
Rowers at the 1992 Summer Olympics
Rowers from Prague
Coxswains (rowing)